Malthonea itaiuba is a species of beetle in the family Cerambycidae. It was described by Martins and Galileo in 1999. It is known from Venezuela.

References

Desmiphorini
Beetles described in 1999